Ron Frazer (7 December 1928 – 8 January 1983) alternatively Ron Fraser,  was an Australian actor, comedian and screenwriter, he was known for roles in theatre and television, primarily as a character actor.

Career
Fraser started his career in 1948 in theatre locally, before moving to London, England working in repertory in the West End, and even appearing briefly in a film, greeting Good afternoon to Elizabeth Taylor. Having came back to Australia, He began in stage revue and wrote many skits and gags for the satirical comedy series The Mavis Bramston Show, before joining the cast as a regular member in 1966, in various roles including the character Ocker; Frazer is credited with neologising the Australian slang term "ocker". In another regular routine Frazer performed in the Bramston show, he used the catchphrase "my second-best friend", and this also gained wide currency at the time.

Frazer also appeared in the Australian sitcoms The Gordon Chater Show, Birds in the Bush and Father, Dear Father in Australia, which was the sequel to the British sitcom.

See also 
 Forty Years of Television: The Story of ATN 7
 Ron Frazer — Australian National University

References

External links

Australian male television actors
Australian male comedians
1928 births
1983 deaths
20th-century Australian male actors
20th-century Australian comedians